The Tapton Hill transmitting station, more generally known as the Sheffield (Crosspool) transmitting station, is a broadcasting and telecommunications facility which serves Sheffield in South Yorkshire and is located on a hill in the suburb of Crosspool to the west of the city. It transmits digital television (with vertical polarisation), analogue radio (FM) and DAB digital radio. It was a relay of Emley Moor for analogue television until the signals were turned off permanently following the Digital Switchover in August 2011. It also feeds the Chesterfield Transmitter with its digital television signal by means of an underground fibre optic cable.

The transmitter was originally an A group for television broadcasts, but to accommodate analogue Channel 5, as well as digital television, it became a wideband until its switchover in 2011. At that point, technically, it became a K group although wideband aerials would still work. The 3 main PSB MUXES are all receivable on an A group aerial (see graph). Sheffield transmitter's 700MHz clearance is due in Feb 2020 when none of the main 6 MUXEs are due to change frequency, though MUXES 7 and 8 are due to be switched off.

Transmitted services

Analogue radio (FM VHF)

Digital radio (DAB)

Digital television

Aerial group: A/K
Polarisation: vertical

Before switchover

† On UHF 39 until 17 March 2010.

Analogue television
Analogue television broadcasts permanently ended from Tapton Hill on 24 August 2011. BBC Two transmissions previously ceased on 10 August.

Aerial group: A/W
Polarisation: vertical

See also 
Belmont transmitting station
Chesterfield transmitting station
Emley Moor transmitting station
Waltham transmitting station

References

External links
Info and pictures of Sheffield transmitter including historical power/frequency changes and present co-receivable transmitters
The Transmission Gallery: Tapton Hill Transmitter photographs and information

Buildings and structures in Sheffield
Mass media in Yorkshire
Transmitter sites in England
Yorkshire Television